MO3 is a tracker module file format developed by Ian Luck for the BASSMOD engine. MO3 files contain samples encoded in the MP3 or Ogg Vorbis formats, rather than straight PCM samples. This results in reduced file size for the module, while maintaining almost identical audio quality. Lossless audio encoding is also supported, for samples that do not compress well with lossy encoding.

The format's name is a portmanteau of MOD and MP3. Despite the name, five other tracker formats are supported besides MOD: Scream Tracker 3 (S3M), FastTracker 2 (XM), Impulse Tracker (IT), OpenMPT (MPTM) and MultiTracker (MTM).

See also 
 XMF (Extensible Music Format)
 XMPlay - an audio player that supports MO3 files
 OpenMPT is a Tracker that can open and edit (but not save) MO3 files

References

External links 
MO3 unofficial specifications, with source code
XMP - XMP supports MO3 files
FAP - Fox Audio Player supports MO3 files

Module file formats